Hugh Ferguson (1863 – 4 November 1937) was a Scottish Unionist Party politician.

After a career as a soldier, Ferguson became involved in the Orange Order, a Protestant Unionist organisation based in Ireland.  Believing that there was a base for his politics in the west of Scotland, he stood for the Motherwell constituency in several Parliamentary elections.

In the 1918 general election, Ferguson won only 10.7% of the vote.  However, in the 1922 election, there was no official Unionist candidate, and standing as an "Independent Unionist", Ferguson came a close second with 29.1%.  By the 1923 election, he was able to secure his adoption as the official Unionist candidate, and narrowly took the seat.  However, he held it for only a year, losing by an equally slim margin.

Ferguson then faded from public view.  In 1933, he was convicted of receiving stolen goods, namely iron plates and railway chairs. He died on 4 November 1937.

References
Michael Stenton and Stephen Lees, Who's Who of British MPs: Volume III, 1919-1945

External links 
 

1863 births
1937 deaths
Unionist Party (Scotland) MPs
Members of the Parliament of the United Kingdom for Scottish constituencies
British politicians convicted of crimes
UK MPs 1923–1924
British Army officers